Mei Otani (大谷芽生, Ōtani Mei, born 28 May 2000) is a Japanese rugby sevens player. She competed in the 2020 Summer Olympics. She was named in the Sakura Sevens squad to compete at the 2022 Rugby World Cup Sevens in Cape Town.

References

2000 births
Living people
Sportspeople from Kyoto
Rugby sevens players at the 2020 Summer Olympics
Japanese rugby sevens players
Olympic rugby sevens players of Japan
Japan international women's rugby sevens players